Brenner Souza da Silva (born 16 January 2000), more commonly known as Brenner, is a Brazilian professional footballer who plays as a forward for Major League Soccer club FC Cincinnati.

Club career

São Paulo
Born in Cuiabá, Brenner joined the youth academy at São Paulo in 2011. Prior to the 2017 season, Brenner was called into the club's first team by coach Dorival Júnior. He made his senior competitive debut for São Paulo on 21 June 2017 in Série A as a 76th minute substitute against Athletico Paranaense, São Paulo losing 1–0. Brenner then scored his first professional goal on 3 December 2017, scoring the opening goal in a 1–1 draw against Bahia. He finished his first season, scoring just once in four matches. The next season, Brenner scored one goal in nine matches in the Campeonato Paulista and scored a goal in six matches in Série A, finding himself mainly used as an option off the bench.

On 31 May 2019, Brenner was loaned to fellow Série A side Fluminense. He stated that working with then head coach Fernando Diniz "weighed heavily" on his choice to move to the club. He made his debut for Fluminense on 2 June 2019 against Athletico Paranaense, coming on as a 78th minute substitute in the 3–0 away defeat. He returned to São Paulo after the season ended, appearing in just six matches without scoring a goal.

2020 season
In January 2020, Brenner returned to São Paulo, who were now coached by his former coach at Fluminense, Fernando Diniz. Brenner credited Diniz for encouraging him to return to the club and believing in him despite not finding regular minutes for São Paulo or Fluminense up to that point. On 22 January, he made his first appearance since returning to the club in a 2–0 victory over Água Santa in the Campeonato Paulista. He then scored his first goal of the season in their 1–1 draw against Novorizontino, scoring the equalizer in the 86th minute. In March 2020, the season was paused in the wake of the COVID-19 pandemic. Prior to that, Brenner continued to be used sparingly, unable to breakthrough for São Paulo against first choice forwards, Alexandre Pato and Pablo.

On 26 July 2020, São Paulo made their return to the pitch, with Brenner starting in the 3–1 victory over Guarani. In August, following the departure of Pato, Brenner began finding more chances in Fernando Diniz's team. He scored his first Série A goal of the season in his first league appearance on 30 August, scoring in the 2nd minute of second half stoppage time against Corinthians to win the match 2–1. He then scored the equalizer for São Paulo in their 3–1 home victory over Brenner's former club Fluminense on 6 September 2020. On 17 September 2020, Brenner made his debut in the Copa Libertadores against River Plate, coming on as a substitute in a 2–2 draw. In the following match, on 22 September, he scored his first goal in the competition against Ecuadorian side L.D.U. Quito, scoring in the 60th minute of a 4–2 away defeat.

In October, Brenner broke-through as a starter for São Paulo after original starter, Pablo, scored just one goal from 10 matches. On 7 October 2020, Brenner scored a brace in the club's 3–0 Série A victory over Goianiense before scoring another brace on 14 October in the Copa do Brasil against Fortaleza, drawing 3–3. He continued his amazing scoring run between 20 October and 1 November, scoring in four straight matches, including two braces against Fortaleza in the second leg of the Copa do Brasil and against Argentine club Lanús in the Copa Sudamericana.

On 11 November 2020, Brenner scored a brace against Flamengo, becoming São Paulo's top goalscorer in a season since 2015 with 17 goals in 26 matches at that point. He also developed a goalscoring relationship with new signing Luciano, who had 11 goals at that point, combining to make 28 between him and Brenner, which was also 50% of São Paulo's goals that season. On 3 December, after going four matches without a goal, Brenner scored the second in a 3–0 victory over Goiás, a key result in the Série A title race. After a brace against Botafogo on 9 December and Fluminense on 26 December, Brenner helped São Paulo enter 2021 at the top of the table, seven points ahead of second placed Atlético Mineiro. Unfortunately, in January 2021, Brenner was unable to find the back of the net in six matches, as São Paulo lost four and drew two matches, pushing the club down to fourth in the table. Fernando Diniz would soon be removed as head coach on 1 February 2021.

When Brenner signed with FC Cincinnati, he finished the 2020 season with 22 goals in 44 appearances.

FC Cincinnati
On 5 February 2021, São Paulo agreed to transfer Brenner to Major League Soccer club FC Cincinnati. The move was officially announced by FC Cincinnati on 9 February, with Brenner joining the club as a young designated player. It was reported in numerous outlets that the transfer fee paid for Brenner was for $13 million.

On 17 April 2021, Brenner made his debut for FC Cincinnati in their opening match away at Nashville SC. He scored the team's second goal from the penalty spot in the 12th minute, as the match ended in a 2–2 draw. On 17 July, Brenner scored his first goals from open play, netting a brace in FC Cincinnati's 5–4 away defeat against CF Montréal.

International career
In February 2017, Brenner was included by coach Carlos Amadeu in the Brazil under-17 team for the South American U-17 Championship. On 4 March, he scored the opener in Brazil's 2–0 victory over Argentina. In September 2017, Brenner was included in the Brazil squad for the FIFA U-17 World Cup in India. He scored in Brazil's final group stage match against Niger, his 34th minute goal helping Brazil win 2–0. In the Round of 16, Brenner scored a brace against Honduras as Brazil won 3–0.

Career statistics

Honours
Brazil U17
South American U-17 Championship: 2017

References

External links
 Profile at FC Cincinnati

2000 births
Living people
People from Cuiabá
Brazilian footballers
Brazil youth international footballers
Association football forwards
Campeonato Brasileiro Série A players
São Paulo FC players
Fluminense FC players
FC Cincinnati players
Designated Players (MLS)
Major League Soccer players
Brazilian expatriate footballers
Brazilian expatriate sportspeople in the United States
Expatriate soccer players in the United States
Sportspeople from Mato Grosso